VR Soccer (also known as VR Soccer '96) is a soccer video game developed and published by VR Sports for the PC, PlayStation, and Sega Saturn.

Gameplay
VR Soccer features Interactive Motion Technology developed by Interplay, which involves motion capture to add movement.

Reception

Next Generation reviewed the PC version of the game, rating it three stars out of five, and stated that "there are lots of perks. The camera pans from different views during play, and at any point, you can replay the action from nearly anywhere in the stadium. There's also multiplayer support and other options. It's a good sim, just not the best."

Reviews
GamePro (May, 1996)
Digitiser - Mar 20, 1995
GameFan Magazine - May, 1996
PC Games - Dec, 1995
Computer Gaming World - Aug, 1996

References

1996 video games
Association football video games
Gremlin Interactive games
Sega Saturn games
Windows games